FK Brodarac 1947 is a defunct football club based in New Belgrade, Serbia. They were closely affiliated with FK Brodarac.

History
Founded in 2014, the club replaced Šumadija Jagnjilo in the Serbian League Belgrade. They spent the next three seasons in the third tier, placing sixth, third, and sixth, respectively. The club eventually stopped competing after the 2016–17 season.

Seasons

Managerial history

References

External links
 Club page at Srbijasport

2014 establishments in Serbia
2017 disestablishments in Serbia
Association football clubs disestablished in 2017
Association football clubs established in 2014
Defunct football clubs in Serbia
Football clubs in Belgrade
New Belgrade